Berkholz-Meyenburg is a former municipality in the Uckermark district, in Brandenburg, Germany. Since 19 April 2022, it is an Ortsteil of the town Schwedt.

Demography

References

Localities in Uckermark (district)
Former municipalities in Brandenburg
Schwedt